Kshanakkathu is a 1990 Indian Malayalam film, directed by TK Rajeev Kumar, starring debutants Niyaz Musaliyar and Athira in the lead roles. The film was a huge box office disaster.

Cast
 Niyaz Musaliyar as Vivek
 Athira as Parvathy alias Pammu
 Thilakan as Vivek's Father
 Kaviyoor Ponnamma as Vivek's Mother
 Nedumudi Venu as Tuition Teacher
 Lakshmi as Parvathy's Mother
 KP Ummer as Parvathy's Father
 Philomina as Maid
 Vettukili Prakash as Vivek's Friend

Plot
Parvathy is a reserved girl who did her schooling from a boarding school in Ooty. On completing her studies in Ooty, she returns to her native town in Kerala to pursue her college studies. Her father is a businessman in Dubai and mother, a socially active lady who is usually away from house. She is not sure what sort of feeling she has for her mother.

Vivek and his three friends are also( studying in her college, and they live nearby her house. Vivek fells for her on first sight. They fall in love with each other with the help of his friends and their tuition master. They make sex during the love. While coming to know about this, Parvathy's mother requests help of police officer and warns Vivek to stay away from her. But they continue to chase their dreams. So Parvathy was kept locked in her house, however Vivek plots to elope with her. But they are stopped on the way by the tuition master, advising them to go back for their good. Parvathy gets admitted in the hospital for intake of poison which was bought by Vivek from a medical store and police registers a case against Vivek for getting her the bottle of poison. However, in the court, Parvathy denies all false allegations against Vivek and he is set free. Parvathy was sent to Dubai.

Things take a turn as Parvathy's father comes to the native place and meets Vivek and his father. He hands over a letter from Parvathy to Vivek and advises him to do well and find a good career. Even after that period, if their love remains, he will get them married. This was agreeable to Vivek and his father. Vivek also hands his response letter to Parvathy's father. Vivek sends a lot of letters addressed to Parvathy's Dubai address, however he does not get anything in return. After a long time of three months, he receives a letter from Parvathy, that contains her wedding invitation with another guy. After knowing this, Vivek's mother falls seriously ill and she finally passes away. Parvathy comes to meet Vivek, however Vivek doesn't want to talk to her as he thinks that she is responsible for his mother's death. Parvathy goes back grief ridden. Vivek's father confesses about the plot suggested by Parvathy's father, during his earlier visit, to collect the letters from the post office and hide them without handing them to each other. He fetches the  bundle of envelopes locked inside his cupboard, which was sent by Parvathy from Dubai, and hands them to Vivek. He also tells him that Vivek's mother was aware of this act. Vivek runs to meet Parvathy at their regular spot, but finds her dead in a houseboat. On seeing this sight, Vivek starts driving the houseboat with Parvathy's dead body inside, endlessly and aimlessly to no destination in particular, till the film ends.

Soundtrack 
The film's soundtrack contains 5 songs (one is repeated), all composed by Sharreth, who debuted through this film, and lyrics were by Kaithapram Damodaran Namboothiri. The background score of the movie was done by Mohan Sithara.

References

External links

1990 films
1990s Malayalam-language films
Films directed by T. K. Rajeev Kumar
Films scored by Sharreth